"Touch Me" is a Italo house song by Italian group 49ers. Produced by Gianfranco Bortolotti, it was released on 4 December 1989 as the third single from their debut album, 49ers (1990). The song received favorable reviews from music critics, reaching number three on the UK Singles Chart and it was a top 10 hit in at least 10 other countries in Europe. Outside Europe, it was the first of four hits on the US Billboard Hot Dance Club Play chart for 49ers. It samples Aretha Franklin's "Rock-A-Lott" and Alisha Warren's "Touch Me".

Chart performance
"Touch Me" was quite successful on the charts across several continents. The song remains the group's biggest hit to date, peaking at number-one on both the Billboard Hot Dance Club Play chart in the United States and the RPM Dance/Urban chart in Canada. It spent two weeks at number-one and a total of eleven weeks on the Billboard dance chart. In Europe, the single entered the top 10 in Austria (9), Denmark (5), Finland (3), Greece (3), Ireland (4), Spain (6), Sweden (8), Switzerland (6), the UK and West Germany (7). In the UK, it peaked at number three in its sixth week at the UK Singles Chart, on January 14, 1990. Additionally, "Touch Me" was a top 20 hit in Belgium (12) and the Netherlands (13). In Oceania, it also entered the top 20, reaching number 15 in New Zealand and number 18 in Australia.

Critical reception
AllMusic editor Alex Henderson felt that Italian producer Gianfranco Bortolotti "sees to it that vocal personality is a prime ingredient of such exuberant offerings" as "Touch Me". Bill Coleman from Billboard described the song as a "soulful "Ride On Time"-style workout", noting that "strong production and a contagious chorus render track satisfying." He added that "the energetic technotrack utilizes the a cappellas (and quite well actually)" of Aretha Franklin's "Rock-A-Lott" and Alisha Warren's modest UK hit "Touch Me". Ernest Hardy from Cashbox found that inspired by the success of Black Box and “Ride on Time”, "this one finds Aretha Franklin in the Loleatta Holloway role." He concluded, "It is full of energy". 

Bob Stanley from Melody Maker felt it's "a beautifully constructed rip-off of "Ride On Time" (which in turn was a beautifully constructed rip-off of "Theme from S'Express")." A reviewer from Music & Media declared it as "storming dance material with house rhythm and loads of samples. Definitely a record with chart and dance floor potential. Listen up." Lola Borg from Smash Hits complimented it as "genuine Italian house music", noting that "it sounds like a cross between Lil Louis (with mad barking dogs) and Black Box and it's fiendishly good and can only be appreciated fully by wiggling all over the shop whilst it's on at full blast." Another editor, Ian Cranna, praised the single as "glorious", with "prime quality Italian house-thumping beats ahoy, rousing piano and strings galore and singalong catchy pop bits all over the shop."

Music video
A music video was produced to promote the single, featuring singer Dawn Mitchell, 49ers frontwoman at that time.

Track listing

Charts

Weekly charts

Year-end charts

References

1989 singles
1990 singles
49ers (group) songs
1989 songs
Songs written by Narada Michael Walden
Songs written by Preston Glass
Island Records singles
Songs written by Gianfranco Bortolotti